The Clyde Littlefield Texas Relays  are an annual track and field competition held at Mike A. Myers Stadium in Austin, Texas.  The University of Texas serves as host for the event, held on either the first or second weekend of April.

Events are held in High School, College, University, and Invitational divisions.

History 
In response to cold-weather conditions at the Kansas Relays, the Texas Relays was started as a men's-only competition in 1925 by University of Texas coach Clyde Littlefield and athletic director Theo Bellmont. The Relays were held at Memorial Stadium until Mike A. Myers Stadium was opened in 1999. The meet was not held 1932-1934 as a result of The Great Depression. Women's events were added in 1963.

To encourage attendance in the early years of the event, various publicity stunts were staged. The most successful was a 1927 stunt in which three Tarahumaras were invited to the Relays. These men were famed as runners who never stopped running. A race was staged between the men from San Antonio to Memorial Stadium. After 14 hours and 53 minutes, the 89 mile race ended in a tie.

In 1977, electronic timing was introduced at the Relays, and Olympic gold medalist and Texas Longhorns football player John Wesley Jones recorded a time of 9.85 seconds in the 100 meter dash. This would have set a world record, but it was determined that the timer malfunctioned, and the time was unofficial.

The Texas Relays are currently the second largest track meet in the United States, behind only the Penn Relays. Today, approximately 50,000 spectators and 5,000 athletes attend the events.

Local impact
According to the Austin Convention and Visitors Bureau in 2007, the Relays generate US$8 million for local business. Much of this traced to the fact that the event has become a social destination for young African-Americans.  A number of groups organize networking and development events for African-Americans to take place in downtown Austin during the Relays.

Following alleged issues involving crime, some local businesses close for the Relays weekend.

Some advocates of the Relays state that there is not a significant increase in crime during the Relays weekend. Some businesses have nonetheless chosen to not operate or to close early.

Divisions
The University Division is open to schools in NCAA Division I.  The College Division is open to schools in NCAA Division II, NCAA Division III, NAIA, or NJCAA schools.  The University/College Division is open to schools that qualify for either division separately.
The High School Division is separated into two levels, Division I and Division II.  Division I is open to schools in the University Interscholastic League classes A, AA, or AAA (or their interstate equivalents).  Division II is open to schools in UIL classes AAAA or AAAAA. Schools that normally compete in Division I may compete in Division II if they wish.

Events held 

Source:. Note: Some men's events are combined for the University and College divisions.

Meet records

Men

Women

Texas Relays results

References
General
Texas Relays records 30 March 2019 updated
Specific

External links
 Texas Relays web site

Annual track and field meetings
College track and field competitions in the United States
High school track and field competitions in the United States